The Miracle is a 1913 Swedish silent drama film directed by Victor Sjöström. It is based on the 1894 novel Lourdes by Émile Zola.

Cast
Jenny Tschernichin-Larsson as Aunt Gaspard 
Clara Pontoppidan as Aunt Gaspard's daughter
Carlo Wieth as Armand  Armand, artist 
John Ekman as Father Prévost 
Justus Hagman as Jean
Axel Wesslau as Jatho 
Carl Borin
Alfred Lundberg

References

External links

1913 films
1910s Swedish-language films
Swedish black-and-white films
1913 drama films
Swedish silent feature films
Films based on works by Émile Zola
Films directed by Victor Sjöström
Films set in Gotland
Swedish drama films
Silent drama films